Lee Hae-in (born 16 April 2005) is a South Korean figure skater. She is the 2023 Four Continents champion, 2022 Four Continents silver medalist, and is a five-time South Korean national senior medalist (silver in 2020; bronze in 2019, 2021, 2022 and 2023).

She is also a two-time champion on the ISU Junior Grand Prix series (2019 JGP Latvia, 2019 JGP Croatia).

Career 
Lee Hae-in was born on 16 April 2005 in Daejeon, South Korea, and began learning to skate in 2013.

2017–2018 season
In  January 2018, at the 2018 senior South Korean Championships, Lee was 9th.

2018–2019 season
In the 2018–2019 season, she debuted in the ISU Junior Grand Prix series.

In January 2019, at the 2019 senior South Korean Championships, she won the bronze medal (behind You Young and Lim Eun-soo).

In March 2019, Lee (along with You Young) represented South Korea at the 2019 World Junior Championships in Zagreb, Croatia. She ranked 14th in the short, which put her in only the third-to-last warm-up group for the free skate. In the free, she placed 7th, rising to 8th overall.

2019–2020 season
In July 2019, Lee Hae-in participated in the ISU Junior Grand Prix Korean qualification competition held in Taeneung, South Korea, where she came in first in the short, free, and overall program. Following the competition, she was selected and assigned to two ISU Junior Grand Prix events, JGP Latvia and JGP Croatia.

At JGP Latvia, she became the third Korean woman ever to become an ISU Junior Grand Prix champion, following Yuna Kim and Kim Hae-jin. She finished third in the short program behind Maiia Khromykh and Daria Usacheva of Russia and placed first in the free program to win the event with a combined total of 197.63 points, more than three points ahead of silver medalist Usacheva. She set personal best scores in the short, free, and overall programs. This event marked the first Junior Grand Prix event won by a Korean lady since Kim Hae-jin's victory at JGP Slovenia in 2012.

At JGP Croatia, she placed second in the short program with a new personal best, again behind Daria Usacheva. After a strong free skate in which she once again scored a new personal best, she placed first overall with a new personal best overall score of 203.40, more than six points ahead of Usacheva in second and 21 points ahead of Anna Frolova in third. This marked the first time that Lee scored above 200 points in a combined total. With two first-place finishes, Lee qualified for the 2019-20 Junior Grand Prix Final as the third-ranked skater, behind Kamila Valieva of Russia and Alysa Liu of the United States. She was the third Korean lady to ever qualify for the final after Kim Yuna and Kim Ye-lim.

At 2020 World Junior Championships in Tallinn, she earned a small silver medal for the short program behind Kamila Valieva, earning gold and ahead of Daria Usacheva, who claimed bronze.  Lee remarked that she had not expected to be in the top three after the short program, adding, "I'm surprised with the score; it’s very high." She also set a new season best for this short program.  In the free skate, Lee fell on a downgraded triple flip attempt, resulting in a sixth-place finish in that segment and ranking fifth overall.

2020–2021 season
With the pandemic greatly curtailing international opportunities for Korean skaters, Lee did not compete on either the Challenger or the Grand Prix circuits, and instead made her competitive debut at the 2021 South Korean Championships.  Second in the short program and fourth in the free skate, she won the bronze medal overall.  She was assigned to one of Korea's two ladies' berths at the 2021 World Championships in Stockholm due to silver medalist Yun Ah-sun being age-ineligible for international senior competition.

Lee placed tenth at the World Championships, which, combined with Kim Ye-lim's eleventh place, qualified two berths for Korean ladies at the 2022 Winter Olympics in Beijing.

2021–2022 season
Lee made her senior Grand Prix debut at the 2021 Skate Canada International, where she placed seventh. She was tenth at the 2021 Internationaux de France, her second event. 

At the 2022 South Korean Championships, the final qualification event for the South Korean Olympic team, Lee won the bronze medal, finishing 1.31 points behind silver medalist Kim Ye-lim. As a result, she was not named to one of Korea's two women's berths. All three national medalists were assigned first to compete at the 2022 Four Continents Championships in Tallinn, where Lee placed second in both segments of the competition to take the silver medal, finishing behind Japan's Mai Mihara but ahead of Kim and You Young, the two skaters assigned to the Olympic team. She said that she was "super happy" with the outcome, noting that the event took place in the same arena as the 2020 World Junior Championships, where she had missed the podium due to free skate errors.

Lee was assigned to finish her season at the 2022 World Junior Championships in Sofia. It was later announced that she would not be competing, instead intending to compete at the Triglav Trophy. Following Kim's withdrawal from the 2022 World Championships due to a positive COVID test, Lee was named to replace her. She finished in seventh place.

2022–2023 season
Lee began the season with two Challenger events, winning the bronze medal at the 2022 CS Nepela Memorial before finishing fourth at the 2022 CS Finlandia Trophy. On the Grand Prix, she finished fourth at both of her Grand Prix events, the 2022 Skate America and 2022 Grand Prix de France. Lee revealed after the second of these that she had been ill during the Grand Prix, impacting her stamina and performance.

At the 2023 South Korean Championships, Lee won the bronze medal, earning championship assignments for the second half of the season. At the 2023 Four Continents Championships in Colorado Springs, she was sixth in the short program after her solo triple flip received an edge call and the second half of her jump combination was called a quarter short of rotation. She said afterward, however, that her main "disappointment" was missing a level on her step sequence. In the free skate, Lee executed seven clean triple jumps, vaulting into the lead in the segment and winning the gold medal. She was the second Korean woman to win the title, after Kim Yuna in 2009.

Programs

Records and achievements 

 After Kim Yuna and Kim Ye-lim, she is the third South Korean woman to exceed 70 in the free skating technical score (TES).
 The first South Korean junior female athlete to exceed 200 points in total.
 First South Korean woman who won two consecutive Junior Grand Prix championships for the first time in 15 years since Yuna Kim.

Competitive highlights 
GP: Grand Prix; JGP: Junior Grand Prix

Detailed results

Senior level

Junior level 

Small medals for short and free programs awarded only at ISU Championships. Personal bests highlighted in bold.

References

External links 

 

2005 births
South Korean female single skaters
Living people
Sportspeople from Daejeon
Figure skaters from Seoul
Four Continents Figure Skating Championships medalists